Gymnopleurus sericeifrons, is a species of dung beetle found in Afro-tropical countries such as Mozambique, Kenya, India and Sri Lanka.

Images
 Images of Gymnopleurus sericeifrons

References 

Scarabaeinae
Insects of Sri Lanka
Insects of India
Insects described in 1887